Mehmet Yurdadön (born 2 June 1954) is a Turkish long-distance runner. He competed in the marathon at the 1984 Summer Olympics.

References

1954 births
Living people
Athletes (track and field) at the 1984 Summer Olympics
Turkish male long-distance runners
Turkish male marathon runners
Olympic athletes of Turkey
Place of birth missing (living people)
20th-century Turkish people
21st-century Turkish people